Piguetiella is a genus of annelids belonging to the family Naididae.

Species:
 Piguetiella blanci (Piguet, 1906) 
 Piguetiella michiganensis Hiltunen, 1967

References

Naididae